Aziridinium is the ionic form of the class of molecules known as aziridines.

Aziridines can be used to insert nitrogen atoms during synthesis, but without any substituents attached to the nitrogen in the ring, they are considered nonactivated and inert. They can be rendered active by the preparation of aziridinium ions. The creation of this ionic species imparts a 47 kJ/mol ring strain increase.

Thus, aziridinium ions render nonactivated aziridines reactive, making them feasible to use in chemical synthesis. Although serving many synthetic purposes, aziridinium ions served as key reagents that were used for the production of nitrogen mustard, or "mustard gas", a chemical warfare agent.

References 

Aziridines